This is a list of electoral results for the Electoral district of Whitford in Western Australian state elections.

Members for Whitford

Election results

Elections in the 1990s

Elections in the 1980s

Elections in the 1970s

References

Western Australian state electoral results by district